Strophalingias is a genus of moth in the family Cosmopterigidae. It contains only one species, Strophalingias allactica, which is found in India (Sikkim).

References

External links
Natural History Museum Lepidoptera genus database

Cosmopterigidae